Triton Showers is a British shower manufacturer based in Warwickshire and is the UK's leading electric shower manufacturer.

History
It was incorporated on 6 May 1975 as Triton (Aquatherm) Limited. It became Triton plc on 2 July 1982. Under the Companies Act 1985, it re-registered as a public limited company in June 1986. The name Triton refers to the Greek god Triton, who was depicted as being half-human and half-fish, and carried a trident.

Triton Showers received two awards, the "Best of British" and "Best Bathroom Supplier" trophies, at the Daily Express Home and Living Awards in 2017.

Ownership
It has been owned by Norcros, headquartered in Wilmslow. It was bought by Norcros Holdings in September 1987.

Product range
The company produces a variety of showers from the retrofittable T80 Pro-Fit electric shower  to the HOST digital mixer shower, using latest shower technology

Structure
The company is situated on Shepperton Park in Nuneaton. It employs about 350 people.

Sports sponsorship
Triton has sponsored sports teams, with the England men's hockey team at the EuroHockey Indoor Nations Championship in February 1991 in Birmingham.

In June 1991 it sponsored a main event at the Royal International Horse Show, held in Birmingham, won by Paul Darragh.

In July 1992, it sponsored an event in the 1992 World Sportscar Championship. It sponsored the Lurgan Park Rally, a motorsport rally in Northern Ireland, from 2003-05.

In 2010, the company sponsored the football ground of Nuneaton Town F.C., being known as the Triton Showers Community Arena.

The companies Irish distributor finances a national rallying contest in Ireland, known as the Triton Showers National Rally Championship.

References

External links
 Triton Showers

Bathroom fixture companies
British companies established in 1975
Companies based in Warwickshire
English brands
Manufacturing companies established in 1975
Nuneaton